The Randolph Freedpeople, also called the Randolph Slaves, were 383 slaves who were manumitted in the will of their master, John Randolph of Roanoke.

History

Wills of John Randolph 
John Randolph was an American politician who owned 383 slaves to manage his 6000-acre plantation. He wrote three separate wills in 1819, 1821, and 1832; if executed they would free the slaves, purchase land to resettle them, or sell them to new masters, respectively. He rejected the third on his deathbed. When Randolph died in 1833, his next-of-kin contested the wills. Thirteen years later, the court ruled that Randolph’s 1821 will was valid. In this document, Randolph wrote: “I give and bequeath to all my slaves their freedom, heartily regretting that I have ever been the owner of one.”  
He also set aside $8,000 to buy a plot of land for the freed slaves to live on. Following the 1846 court decision, Judge William Leigh, the chosen executor of Randolph’s will, purchased 2000 acres in Mercer County, Ohio.

Relocation 
The Randolph Freedpeople left for Ohio in the same year. They were provided with a 16-wagon convoy; however, most walked. They camped along the side of the road in tents. After reaching Kanawha, West Virginia, the group took a steamboat to Cincinnati, a month after beginning their journey. Then they sailed up the Miami-Erie Canal and arrived in Mercer County.

As they were about to disembark, armed German settlers stopped them at the shore and told Mr. Cardwell, the wagon master, that the Freedpeople must leave the town by 10:00 the following morning and that they would not be compensated for the lost land. The Mercer County settlers also wrote three resolutions to remove the Freedpeople. One of these read:“Resolved. That we will not live among Negroes, as we have settled here first, we have fully determined that we will resist the settlement of blacks and mulattoes in this country to the full extent of our means, the bayonet not excepted.”Although Cardwell volunteered to be imprisoned in exchange for the safety of the Freedpeople, the settlers denied the offer.

Following the confrontation, the Randolph Freedpeople ultimately dispersed and set up communities throughout Miami and Shelby counties. One of these communities was Randolph Settlement in Rossville. On 18 February 1857, William Rial, one of the Freedpeople, bought a plot from landowner W.W. McFarland, founding Randolph Settlement. Randolph Settlement eventually became the site of African Jackson Cemetery.

Reunions and lawsuit 
In July 1900, the surviving Freedpeople held a reunion at Midway Park in which they formed the Randolph Ex-Slaves Association. 62 of the original Virginian slaves attended, known as “Old Dominions”, as well as the “Buckeyes”, those from Ohio. Reunions of the Old Dominions were then held annually from 1900 to 1906; anywhere from 100-300 people attended.

In 1907, 170 Freedpeople filed lawsuits to obtain compensation for the land in Mercer County that they had been removed from, either in the form of the land itself or $38,000. The Mercer County Common Pleas Court ruled that no compensation could be awarded as the statute of limitations, 21 years, had expired. The case lasted ten years and went all the way to the Supreme Court of the United States; it affirmed the decision of the court in Pequa.

Legacy 
In 2017, the city of Piqua converted a drive-through into an information center about the Randolph Freedpeople. The dedication ceremony and opening took place on 16 July of the same year; during the ceremony, a minister washed the feet of Kazy Hinds, who was mayor at the time, as a symbol of unity.

In 2018, Piqua Public Library displayed “Freed Will: The Randolph Freedpeople from Slavery to Settlement”, a traveling display by the National Afro-American Museum & Cultural Center in conjunction with Ohio History Connection.

References 

19th-century American slaves
Slavery in the United States